The 1977 October Revolution Parade was a military parade that took place in the Red Square in Moscow on 7 November 1977 to commemorate the 60th anniversary of the October Revolution. The annual parade marks the protest of the Bolsheviks against the Tsarist autocracy of the Russian Empire. The Soviet Communist Party General Secretary Leonid Brezhnev and Soviet Prime Minister Alexei Kosygin attended the parade, among other foreign leaders from Warsaw Pact and allied countries who decided to fly in for the celebrations. Marshal Dmitry Ustinov delivered his second holiday address to the Soviet people on this day, right after the parade inspection that had been presided over by him and led by the commander of the Moscow Garrison Colonel General Vladimir Govorov. Music was performed by the Combined Military Band of the Moscow Garrison conducted by Colonel Nikolai Mikhailov. As per tradition, 14 other Soviet Cities (including Leningrad) held their parades on this day. A folding stock version of the AK-47 appeared in the contingent of troops from the Soviet Airborne Forces. This parade included the updated anthem of the Soviet Union.

International dignitaries

Parade units

Military bands
 Massed Bands of the Moscow Military District under the direction of Major General Nikolai Mikhailov, Senior Director of Music of the Bands Service
 Corps of Drums of the Moscow Military Music School

Ground column
Leading the column was the limousine carrying the parade commander, Col. General Vladimir Govrov, the commanding general of Moscow Military District.
 Color Guard Unit
 Frunze Military Academy
 V.I. Lenin Military Political Academy
 Felix Dzerzhinsky Artillery Academy
 Military Armored Forces Academy Marshal Rodion Malinovsky
 Military Engineering Academy
 Military Academy of Chemical Defense and Control
 Yuri Gagarin Air Force Academy
 Prof. Nikolai Zhukovsky Air Force Engineering Academy
 Naval Engineering Institute
 Moscow Border Guards Institute of the Border Defence Forces of the KGB "Moscow City Council"
 Active military units:
 98th Guards Airborne Division
 OMSDON
 336th Marine Regiment of the Baltic Fleet
 Suvorov Military School
 Nakhimov Naval School
 Moscow Military High Command Training School "Supreme Soviet of the Russian SFSR"

Mobile column
The parade saw the return of military tanks after a two-year hiatus. The highlight was the T-72 tank was first publicly seen at this parade. The parade also featured a full return to the iconic armor columns and missiles in the second half of the military portion of the parade.

Gallery

References

November 1977 events in Europe
1977 in Moscow
1977 in the Soviet Union
October Revolution parades